Tomáš Sedlák (born 3 February 1983) is a Slovak professional footballer who currently plays for 1. FC Tatran Prešov in the Fortuna Liga.

External links
 
 Eurofotbal profile 
 
 

1983 births
Living people
Sportspeople from Poprad
Slovak footballers
Association football defenders
Association football midfielders
MFK Ružomberok players
Gaziantepspor footballers
SV Mattersburg players
Kaposvári Rákóczi FC players
MFK Zemplín Michalovce players
FK Poprad players
1. FC Tatran Prešov players
Slovak Super Liga players
Slovak expatriate footballers
Expatriate footballers in Turkey
Expatriate footballers in Austria
Expatriate footballers in Hungary
Slovak expatriate sportspeople in Turkey
Slovak expatriate sportspeople in Austria
Slovak expatriate sportspeople in Hungary